Oenin is an anthocyanin. It is the 3-glucoside of malvidin. It is one of the red pigments found in the skin of purple grapes and in wine.

Color stabilization of malvidin 3-glucoside at a higher pH can be explained by self-aggregation of the flavylium cation and copigmentation with the Z-chalcone form. In the presence of procyanidin C2, the red color of oenin appears more stable. However, the HPLC chromatogram shows a decrease in the amplitude of the peaks of oenin and procyanidin C2. Concomitantly, a new peak appears with a maximal absorption in the red region. This newly formed pigment probably comes from the condensation of oenin and procyanidin C2.

Malvidin 3-glucoside alone is not oxidized in the presence of grape polyphenol oxidase, whereas it is degraded in the presence of a crude grape PPO extract and of caftaric acid forming anthocyanidin-caftaric acid adducts.

See also 
 Phenolic compounds in wine
 Wine color
 Malvidin glucoside-ethyl-catechin
 Anthocyanone A, a degradation product of oenin found in wine

References 

O-methylated anthocyanins